Champ-sur-Yonne is a commune in the Yonne department in Bourgogne-Franche-Comté in north-central France.

Its inhabitants are called
"Champicaunais". Champs-sur-Yonne is part of the metropolitan area of
Auxerre

Geography
Champs is in the Valley of the Yonne River, on the east bank of the river.
The soil is alluvial, made both from local limestones and erosion
products from the source of the Yonne in the Morvan. There is
little agriculture in the mostly built up village, but typical crops
include wheat, hemp, and sunflowers.

History
There have been local settlements in the area since at least Roman
times, but the growth of Champs as a distinct commune dates from the
building of the three water mills on the Yonne in the eighteenth century.

Population
1962= 721
1968= 820
1975= 1163
1982= 1489
1990= 1525
1999= 1382
2006= 1712

See also
Communes of the Yonne department

References

Communes of Yonne